Two-time defending champion Lindsay Davenport and her partner Natasha Zvereva defeated Alexandra Fusai and Nathalie Tauziat in the final, 6–7(6–8), 7–5, 6–3 to win the doubles tennis title at the 1998 WTA Tour Championships.

Davenport and Jana Novotná were the defending champions, but they competed with different partners that year: Davenport with Zvereva, and Novotná with Martina Hingis. Hingis and Novotná were defeated in the quarterfinals by Yayuk Basuki and Caroline Vis.

Seeds
Champion seeds are indicated in bold text while text in italics indicates the round in which those seeds were eliminated.

 Martina Hingis /  Jana Novotná (quarterfinals)
 Lindsay Davenport /  Natasha Zvereva (champions)
 Lisa Raymond /  Rennae Stubbs (semifinals)
 Alexandra Fusai /  Nathalie Tauziat (final)

Draw

External links
 1998 Chase Championships Doubles Draw
 Main draw (WTA)

WTA Tour Championships
1998 WTA Tour